Enlighten the Darkness is the fifth studio album by German heavy metal band Angel Dust, released in 2000.

Track listing 
"Let Me Live" – 5:53
"The One You Are" – 5:29
"Enjoy!" – 5:52
"Fly Away" – 6:47
"Come Into Resistance" – 5:24
"Beneath the Silence" – 3:05
"Still I'm Bleeding" – 4:18
"I Need You" – 5:21
"First in Line" – 1:15
"Cross of Hatred" – 4:59
"Oceans of Tomorrow" – 4:17

Credits 
Dirk Thurisch – vocals
Bernd Aufermann – guitar
Frank Banx – bass
Steven Banx – keyboards
Dirk Assmuth – drums

References 
 Album info on the band's official website

2000 albums
Angel Dust (German band) albums
Century Media Records albums